Kalisundham Raa is a 2000 Indian Telugu-language drama film directed by Udayasankar and produced by D. Suresh Babu. It stars Venkatesh and Simran, with music composed by S. A. Rajkumar. It received the National Film Award for Best Feature Film in Telugu at National Film Awards 2001. The film won four Nandi Awards by Government of Andra Pradesh.

At the time of its release, it was the highest grossing Telugu movie of all time until it was broken by Narasimha Naidu (2001) the following year. The film was remade in Hindi as Kuch Tum Kaho Kuch Hum Kahein (2002) and in Kannada as Ondagona Baa (2003).

Plot
Raghavayya and Ram Mohan Rao are brothers-in-law. But Ram Mohan Rao is at loggerheads with Raghavayya because of a family feud. Raghavayya is nearing his 60s and it's time for his Shastipoorti ceremony. Upon incessant requests from his wife, Raghavayya decides to invite (for the first time) his daughter-in-law and grandchildren who are staying in Bombay. Raghu is the alienated handsome grandson of Raghavia. After arriving at Ramapuram from Bombay, he faces embarrassment from the members of Raghavayya's family. There he meets a childlike beauty Manga. Manga and Raghu play a few pranks on each other and slowly they fall deeply in love. But they never admit their love to each other. With his unconditional love towards the family members, Raghu wins their confidence and hearts.

Later on, Raghu discovers the cause of the feud between the families of Raghavayya and Ram Mohan Rao. Raghu's father Bhaskar Rao is supposed to marry Ram Mohan Rao's daughter Rajani. Bhaskar prefers his college flame Kousalya rather than Rajani, so he leaves for Mumbai and gets married, and disappointed Rajani opts for suicide. Ram Mohan Rao blames it on Raghavayya and starts treating him indifferently. Erra Babu, the fiery son of Ram Mohan Rao, is another victim of the incident. He develops a prejudice against Raghavayya and aims for his blood.

After a few days of timely strategic manipulation, Raghu succeeds in bringing the two troubled families together. Then they decide to marry Manga off to Ram Mohan Rao's grandson to tighten their family bonds. Raghu sacrifices his love in order to make sure that everybody is happy. As the preparations are going on for the wedding Manga, they find that Manga is missing. Everyone knows about Raghu and Manga's love story and finally Erra Babu realizes his mistake and also agrees to their love and unites both lovers.

Cast

 Venkatesh as Raghu
 Simran as Manga
 K. Viswanath as Raghavayya
 Srihari as Erra Babu
 Brahmanandam as Ramavadhani
 Ali as Snake Man
 AVS as Venkatadri
 M. S. Narayana as Lawyer Lingam
 Ahuti Prasad as Shankar Rao
 Ranganath as Ram Mohan Rao
 Rallapalli as Govindu
 Prasad Babu as Prasad
 Vinod as Siva
 Achyuth as Bhaskar Rao
 Raja Ravindra as Ram Mohan Rao's son-in-law
 Ananth as Constable
 Chitti Babu as Subbavadhani
 Gundu Hanumantha Rao as Barber
 Gautam Raju as Peon
 Chandra Mouli
 Madhu as Rowdy
 Jenny as Priest
 Annapurna as Janaki
 Venniradi Nirmala as Kousalya
 Rama Prabha as Kantham
 C. R. Vijayakumari as Aliveelu Mangatayaru
 Vinaya Prasad as Anasuya
 Sudha as Raghu's aunty
 Kalpana Rai as Rathalu
 Shanoor Sana as Parvathi
 Malika as Raghu's aunty
 Kalpana
 Meena Kumari as Rajani
 Harika as Sirisha
 Deepika
 Manoja
 Lata
 Master Sajja Teja as Sandeep
 Master Aajaa Mohar
 Master Kireethi
 Master Pavan
 Master Aseem
 Baby Sindhura 
 Baby Bhagyasri

≠edit songs≠

Music 

Music was composed by S. A. Rajkumar. Music released on SUPREME Music Company.

Remakes

Box office
Kalisundham Raa was rated as the biggest hit in Telugu cinema in 70 years until the release of Nuvve Kavali in 2000. It ran for a record 100 days in 76 centres, 175 days in 17 centres and 200 days in 3 centres. It broke the records made by Samarasimha Reddy in 1999.

Awards
National Film Awards
 National Film Award for Best Feature Film in Telugu
 Filmfare Awards
 Filmfare Special Jury Award for Best Actor - Venkatesh
Nandi Awards
 Best Feature Film - Gold - D. Suresh Babu
 Best Actor - Venkatesh
 Best Supporting Actor - K. Vishwanath
 Best Story Writer - Dinraj and Uday Shankar
 Film fan's Association Awards
 Best Feature Film - D. Suresh Babu
 Best Actor - Venkatesh
 Best Actress - Simran

References

External links
 

2000s Telugu-language films
Telugu films remade in other languages
2000 films
Indian romantic comedy-drama films
Nandi Award winners
2000 romantic comedy-drama films
Films based on Romeo and Juliet
Best Telugu Feature Film National Film Award winners
Suresh Productions films
Films directed by Udayasankar